Clanculus limbatus, common name the keeled clanculus, is a species of sea snail, a marine gastropod mollusk in the family Trochidae, the top snails.

Description
The size of the shell varies between 13 mm and 20 mm. The depressed, umbilicate shell has a conoidal shape. It is carinate at its periphery. Its color is whitish or yellowish, maculated with brown, generally with a series of blotches at the periphery and beneath the suture, the intervening space unicolored or more or less tessellated. The base of the shell is tessellated or radiately flamed. The spire is low conical with an acute, smooth apex. The 5 to 6 whorls are convex just below the sutures, then flattened, and at the periphery carinated. The sutures are subcanaliculate. The body whorl scarcely descends anteriorly, above with 6 to 8 spiral closely granose cinguli, beneath with 7 to 9 similar concentric cinguli. The interstices both above and below are closely, sharply, obliquely, and microscopically striate. The base of the shell is slightly convex. The oblique aperture is tetragonal. The outer lip is four or five-lirate within, the upper fold somewhat enlarged and subdentiform. The basal margin and marginal rib of the umbilicus are finely plicate. The columella is oblique, nearly straight, its edge reflexed and plicate-dentate, terminating below in a small square denticle, inserted above upon the side of the umbilicus. The umbilicus is  rather wide and funnel-shaped.

Distribution
This marine species is endemic to Australia and occurs off South Australia, Tasmania, Victoria and Western Australia.

References

 Philippi, R.A. 1849. Centuria altera Testaceorum novorum. Zeitschrift für Malakozoologie 5: 99-112
 Philippi, R.A. 1849. Trochidae. 73-120, pls 36-39 in Küster, H.C. (ed). Systematisches Conchylien-Cabinet von Martini und Chemnitz. Nürnberg : Bauer & Raspe Vol. II.
 Philippi, R.A. 1852. Trochidae. pp. 185–232, in Küster, H.C. (ed). Systematisches Conchylien-Cabinet von Martini und Chemnitz. Nürnberg : Bauer & Raspe Vol. 2.
 Adams, A. 1853. Contributions towards a monograph of the Trochidae, a family of gastropodous Mollusca. Proceedings of the Zoological Society of London 1851(19): 150-192
 Philippi, R.A. 1855. Trochidae. pp. 249–328 in Küster, H.C. (ed). Systematisches Conchylien-Cabinet von Martini und Chemnitz. Nürnberg : Bauer & Raspe Vol. 2
 Angas, G.F. 1865. On the marine molluscan fauna of the Province of South Australia, with a list of all the species known up to the present time, together with remarks on their habitats and distribution, etc. Proceedings of the Zoological Society of London 1865: 155-"180"
 Tapparone-Canefri, C.M 1873. Malacologia in "Zoologia del viaggio intorno al globo della regia fregata Magenta durante gli anni 1865–68". Zoologia Magenta 162 pp. 4 pls 
 Fischer, P. 1877. Genres Calcar, Trochus, Xenophora, Tectarius et Risella. pp. 115–240 in Keiner, L.C. (ed.). Spécies general et iconographie des coquilles vivantes. Paris : J.B. Baillière Vol. 11.
 Tenison-Woods, J.E. 1879. Census; with brief descriptions of the marine shells of Tasmania and the adjacent islands. Proceedings of the Royal Society of Tasmania 1877: 26-57 
 Hutton, F.W. 1880. Manual of the New Zealand Mollusca. Wellington : Colonial Museum and Geological Survey Department 224 pp.
 Harris, G.F. 1897. Catalogue of Tertiary Mollusca in the Department of Geology, British Museum (Natural History). The Australasian Tertiary Mollusca. London : British Museum of Natural History Part 1 407 pp., 8 pls
 Tate, R. & May, W.L. 1901. A revised census of the marine Mollusca of Tasmania. Proceedings of the Linnean Society of New South Wales 26(3): 344-471
 Pritchard, G.B. & Gatliff, J.H. 1902. Catalogue of the marine shells of Victoria. Part V. Proceedings of the Royal Society of Victoria 14(2): 85-138 
 May, W.L. 1921. A Checklist of the Mollusca of Tasmania. Hobart, Tasmania : Government Printer 114 pp. 
 May, W.L. 1923. An Illustrated Index of Tasmanian Shells. Hobart : Government Printer 100 pp.
 Iredale, T. 1924. Results from Roy Bell's molluscan collections. Proceedings of the Linnean Society of New South Wales 49(3): 179-279, pl. 33-36 
 Cotton, B.C. & Godfrey, F.K. 1934. South Australian Shells. Part 11. South Australian Naturalist 15(3): 77-92 
 Cotton, B.C. 1959. South Australian Mollusca. Archaeogastropoda. Handbook of the Flora and Fauna of South Australia. Adelaide : South Australian Government Printer 449 pp. 
 Macpherson, J.H. & Gabriel, C.J. 1962. Marine Molluscs of Victoria. Melbourne : Melbourne University Press & National Museum of Victoria 475 pp
 Macpherson, J.H. 1966. Port Philip Survey 1957-1963. Memoirs of the National Museum of Victoria, Melbourne 27: 201-288
 Wells, F.E. & Bryce, C.W. 1986. Seashells of Western Australia. Perth : Western Australian Museum 207 pp.
 Wilson, B. 1993. Australian Marine Shells. Prosobranch Gastropods. Kallaroo, Western Australia : Odyssey Publishing Vol. 1 408 pp.
 Jansen, P. 1995. A review of the genus Clanculus Montfort, 1810 (Gastropoda: Trochidae) in Australia, with description of a new subspecies and the introduction of a nomen novum. Vita Marina 43(1-2): 39-62

External links
 To Biodiversity Heritage Library (11 publications)
 To World Register of Marine Species
 

limbatus
Gastropods of Australia
Gastropods described in 1834